Eumenes (c. 362316 BC) was a Greek general and satrap. He participated in the Wars of Alexander the Great, serving as both Alexander's personal secretary and as a battlefield commander. He later was a participant in the Wars of the Diadochi as a supporter of the Macedonian Argead royal house. He was executed after the Battle of Gabiene in 316 BC.

Early career
Eumenes was a native of Cardia in the Thracian Chersonese. At a very early age, he was employed as a private secretary by Philip II of Macedon and after Philip's death (336 BC) by Alexander the Great, whom he accompanied into Asia. After Alexander's death (323 BC), Eumenes took command of a large body of Macedonian and other Greek soldiers fighting in support of Alexander's son, Alexander IV.

Satrap of Cappadocia and Paphlagonia (323-319 BC)
In the ensuing division of the empire in the Partition of Babylon (323 BC), Cappadocia and Paphlagonia were assigned to Eumenes; but as they were not yet subdued, Leonnatus and Antigonus were charged by Perdiccas with securing them for him. Antigonus, however, ignored the order, and Leonnatus vainly attempted to induce Eumenes to accompany him to Europe and share in his far-reaching designs. Eumenes joined Perdiccas, who installed him in Cappadocia.

Battle of the Hellespont (321 BC)
When Craterus and Antipater, having subdued Greece in the Lamian War, determined to pass into Asia and overthrow the power of Perdiccas, their first blow was aimed at Cappadocia. Craterus and Neoptolemus, the satrap of Armenia, were completely defeated by Eumenes in the Battle of the Hellespont in 321. Neoptolemus was killed, and Craterus died of his wounds.

After the death of Perdiccas
After the murder of Perdiccas in Egypt by his own soldiers (320 BC), the Macedonian generals condemned Eumenes to death at the Conference at Triparadisus, assigning Antipater and Antigonus as his executioners. 

Eumenes first travelled to Mount Ida where there was a royal stable. Eumenes took a large number of horses to replenish his Cappadocian cavalry. He took the time to file an account with the overseers of the stables despite his outlaw status. Upon hearing this, Antipater was greatly amused, however, it is clear that Eumenes made this move to show that he was acting under the law and in the service of the Argead House. 

Since he would be facing a force superior in infantry, Eumenes decided to travel to the plains of Sardis where his advantage in cavalry would be decisive. He had also hoped to win the support of Cleopatra of Macedon, who was present in the city at the time. Cleopatra and Eumenes had been friends since childhood, however, Cleopatra was not willing to back what seemed to be a losing cause and implored Eumenes to leave the area lest she incur the wrath of Antipater. Eumenes obliged her and moved north into Phrygia to winter.

Despite his superior military skills, Eumenes’ Macedonian generals approached him about one of them taking overall command. Eumenes retorted that “formalities and technicalities would not protect them from death and destruction”. To further guarantee the loyalty of subordinates, Eumenes sold off the estates of Phrygia to them and provided military support to claim the purchased land from the, obviously, unwilling and disgruntled Phrygian property owners. This revenue was used to pay his soldiers.

After the Conference at Triparadisus
Following the Conference at Triparadisus, Antigonus first placed a bounty on the Greek general’s head of 100 talents of gold. News of this came immediately after Eumenes’ financial rewards, so his officers and men were outraged and redoubled their efforts to protect their leader, assigning a large bodyguard of 1000 men to protect him at all times. Eumenes was also granted the privilege of wearing a purple hat and cloak, an honour usually only granted to a Macedonian king.

In 319 BC, Antigonus marched his army into Cappodocia and engaged Eumenes at the Battle of Orkynia. Here, Eumenes was defeated due to an unknown act of a traitor who Antigonus possibly bribed. Although defeated, Eumenes swiftly acted to chase down and execute this traitor, which restored the faith of his men.

Following this battle, Antigonus neglected to address the dead and immediately set off in pursuit for Eumenes. Determined to follow tradition, Eumenes made the bold and unexpected move to regain the battlefield so that he could construct a proper funeral pyre for the dead. This action greatly impressed Antigonus.

Remainder of the campaign
The remainder of the campaign turned into a battle of manoeuvre, with Eumenes avoiding further battle with Antigonus. At one point, Eumenes was in a position to capture the baggage of Antigonus’ forces. Eumenes knew that he would not be able to prevent his soldiers from plundering this loot if they found out about it and also that doing so would decrease the essential mobility of his forces. Eumenes dispatched a private message to his old friend, the general Menander, advising him to move the baggage uphill so that its capture would be impossible. Menander immediately followed this advice. He and his fellow officers were shocked by this move and thought Eumenes to be a paragon of virtue. Only Antigonus knew of Eumenes’ real motives. This action is also ironic when compared to the steps Antigonus had to take to finally defeat Eumenes.

The following winter, Eumenes disbanded his army, save for a small, crack force of 500 cavalry and 200 heavy infantry and holed up in Nora, a strong fortress on the border between Cappadocia and Lycaonia. Antigonus arrived shortly and decided to enter into negotiation with Eumenes instead of undergoing a lengthy siege. 

Antigonus wanted to acquire Eumenes as his own officer and so first demanded that Eumenes address him as a superior officer, to which Eumenes replied “while I am able to wield a sword, I shall thank no man greater than myself”. 

During negotiations, Eumenes was unable to secure a deal he thought fitting and so was willing to hold out longer for a more favourable position in the imperial hierarchy. Antigonus then departed with his army, leaving behind only forces sufficient to blockade Nora. 

In the cramped city, Eumenes was forced to come up with novel solutions so that his men and horses remained in fighting shape including; emptying large rooms where men exercised on a set schedule, and creating a suspension device, likened to an ancient treadmill, on which horses could run. 

Eumenes held out for more than a year until the death of Antipater threw his opponents into disarray.

The Second War of the Diadochi
Antipater had left the regency to his friend Polyperchon instead of his son Cassander. Cassander, therefore, allied himself with Antigonus, Lysimachus and Ptolemy, while Eumenes allied himself with Polyperchon. He was able to escape from Nora by tricking the Antigonid diplomat, his friend and countryman Hieronymus of Cardia,  sent to negotiate his surrender, into having him swear an oath of loyalty to the two kings, Philip III and Alexander IV instead of Antigonus himself. By swearing an oath to an infant and a developmentally disabled man, this essentially gave Eumenes free rein to act in whatever manner he saw as in the best interest of the Argead Dynasty and, therefore, himself. 

Eumenes acted quickly to muster his army and marched into Cilicia, where he allied with Antigenes and Teutamus, the commanders of the famous Macedonian Silver Shields. Eumenes again demonstrated his cleverness and was able to secure control over these men by playing on their loyalty to, and superstitious awe of, Alexander.  He claimed that Alexander had visited him in a dream and told him that he would be present with them at every battle. Eumenes even went so far as to set up a tent for the late conqueror complete with a throne. He used the royal treasury at Kyinda to recruit an army of mercenaries to add to his own troops.

In 317 BC, Eumenes left Cilicia and marched into Syria and Phoenicia, and began to raise a naval force on behalf of Polyperchon. When it was ready, he sent the fleet west to reinforce Polyperchon, but it was met by Antigonus's fleet off the coast of Cilicia, and the fleet of Eumenes changed sides.

Meanwhile, Antigonus had settled his affairs in Asia Minor and marched east to take out Eumenes before he could do further damage. Eumenes somehow had advance knowledge of this and marched out of Phoenica, through Syria into Mesopotamia, with the idea of gathering support in the upper satrapies.

Eumenes in the East
Eumenes gained the support of Amphimachos, the satrap of Mesopotamia, then marched his army into Northern Babylonia, where he put them into winter quarters. During the winter he negotiated with Seleucus, the satrap of Babylonia, and Peithon, the satrap of Media, seeking their help against Antigonus. Unable to sway Seleucus and Peithon, Eumenes left his winter quarters early and marched on Susa, a major royal treasury, in Susiana. In Susa, Eumenes sent letters to all the satraps to the north and east of Susiana, ordering them in the kings' names to join him with all their forces. When the satraps joined Eumenes he had a considerable force, with which he could look forward with some confidence to doing battle against Antigonus. Eumenes then marched southeastwards into Persia, where he picked up additional reinforcements.

Antigonus, meanwhile, had reached Susa and left Seleucus there to besiege the place while he himself marched after Eumenes. At the river Kopratas, Eumenes surprised Antigonus during the crossing of the river and killed or captured 4,000 of his men. Antigonus, faced with disaster, decided to abandon the crossing and turned back northward, marching up into Media, threatening the upper satrapies. Eumenes wanted to march westward and cut Antigonus's supply lines, but the satraps refused to abandon their satrapies and forced Eumenes to stay in the east.

In the late summer of 316 BC, Antigonus moved southward again in the hope of bringing Eumenes to battle and ending the war quickly. Eventually, the two armies met in southern Media and fought the indecisive Battle of Paraitakene. Antigonus, whose casualties were more numerous, force marched his army to safety the next night. During the winter of 316-315 BC, Antigonus tried to surprise Eumenes in Persis by marching his army across a desert and catching his enemy off guard; unfortunately, he was observed by some locals who reported it to his opponents. A few days later both armies drew up for battle. The Battle of Gabiene was as indecisive as the previous battle at Parataikene. According to Plutarch and Diodorus, Eumenes had won the battle but lost control of his army's baggage camp thanks to his ally Peucestas' duplicity or incompetence. In addition to all the loot of the Silver Shields (treasure accumulated over 30 years of successful warfare including gold, silver, gems and other booty), the soldiers' women and children were taken, and Eumenes' army wished to negotiate their return.

Teutamus, one of their commanders, sent the request to Antigonus, who responded by demanding they give him Eumenes. The Silver Shields complied, arrested Eumenes and his officers, and handed them over. The war was thus at an end. Eumenes was placed under guard while Antigonus held a council to ponder his fate. Antigonus, supported by his son Demetrius, was disinclined to kill Eumenes, but most of the council insisted that he execute Eumenes and so it was decided.

Death
Antigonus, according to Plutarch, starved Eumenes for three days but finally sent an executioner to dispatch him when the time came for him to move his camp. Eumenes' body was given to his friends to be burnt with honour, and his ashes were conveyed in a silver urn to his wife and children.

Legacy
Despite Eumenes' undeniable skills as a general, he never commanded the full allegiance of the Macedonian officers in his army and died as a result. He was an able commander who did his utmost to maintain the unity of Alexander's empire in Asia. Still, his efforts were frustrated by generals and satraps both nominally under his command and under that of his enemies.  Eumenes was hated and despised by many fellow commanders—certainly for his successes and supposedly for his non-Macedonian (in the tribal sense) background and prior office as Royal Secretary. Eumenes has been seen as a tragic figure, a man who seemingly tried to do the right thing but was overcome by a more ruthless enemy and the treachery of his own soldiers.

Historie is a historical fiction manga series that tells the life story of Eumenes.

Family
Pharnabazus III, Persian satrap of Phrygia, was his brother-in-law, as Eumenes married Artonis, the daughter of Persian satrap Artabazus II and sister of Pharnabazus III.

Sources
Plutarch - the main surviving biography of Eumenes is by Plutarch. Plutarch's parallel Roman life was the life of Sertorius.
Diodorus - Eumenes is a significant figure in books 16–18 of Diodorus's history
Richard A. Billows, Antigonos the One-Eyed and the Creation of the Hellenistic State, a biography of Antigonos Monopthalmus (Eumenes's main opponent during the Second War of the Diadochi).

References

Sources 
Edward Anson, Eumenes of Cardia: A Greek among Macedonians, Brill Academic Publishers, 2004.

External links
The Life of Eumenes by Plutarch
The Historical Library by Diodorus - books XVIII and XIX
The Life of Eumenes by Cornelius Nepos

316 BC deaths
4th-century BC Greek people
Ancient Thracian Greeks
Ancient Greek generals
Generals of Alexander the Great
Generals of Philip II of Macedon
Trierarchs of Nearchus' fleet
Satraps of the Alexandrian Empire
Macedonian royal secretaries
360s BC births
Executed ancient Greek people